The One Academy of Communication Design (generally shortened to The One Academy) is a private arts and design institute headquartered in Bandar Sunway, Selangor, with a northern campus in George Town, Penang.

History

The One Academy was founded in 1991 by Tatsun Hoi and Veronica Ho.

Tatsun Hoi, Principal and Managing Director of The One Academy, is the Honorary President of the Young Entrepreneurs Association of Malaysia. The late Veronica Ho was a Dean's List Scholar from New York's Parsons School of Design. She served as Joint Managing Director and Dean of Studies at The One Academy from 1991 until 2009. Serving as Chairman of The One Academy is Ali Mohamed, former chairman of Leo Burnett Malaysia.

Academic Structure
The One Academy offers academic programmes for Diploma and bachelor's degree levels. The academy is structured into the following eight schools:
 School of Advertising & Graphic Design
 School of Digital Animation
 School of Digital Media Design
 School of Illustration
 School of Interior Design
 School of Fine Arts
 School of Visual Effects
 School of Fashion Design & Pattern Making (ESMOD Kuala Lumpur)

University of Hertfordshire - The One Academy Design Degree Programme
In 2008, The One Academy partnered with the University of Hertfordshire of United Kingdom to provide an array of Bachelor of Arts (Honours) degree programmes, where students can complete the course and gain the degrees either in its Bandar Sunway campus or the United Kingdom:
 Bachelor of Arts (Hons) in Digital Media Design
 Bachelor of Arts (Hons) in Graphic Design
 Bachelor of Arts (Hons) in Interior Architecture and Design

ESMOD Kuala Lumpur
In 2012, The One Academy collaborated with ESMOD Paris to establish a fashion design institute in Kuala Lumpur,
 with the aim to cater to the growing demand for an international design school in the region. It has 20 schools in 13 countries around the world, offering the same world class fashion design syllabus. Upon completion of the 3-year course which combines the creativity in fashion design and the practical skills in pattern making, students will be awarded a Diploma in Fashion Design and Pattern Making.

Publications 

 Astonishing Digital Art II

Affiliates 
The One Academy has also fostered academic partnerships with various art and design institutions of higher learning in the UK, the US, Australia and New Zealand, where eligible students are able to pursue an international degree upon successful completion of their 3-year Diploma programme.
 University of Hertfordshire, UK
 Birmingham City University, UK
 University of The West of England, UK
 Teesside University, UK
 Middlesex University London, UK
 Swinburne University of Technology, AUS
 JMC Academy, AUS
 Auckland University of Technology, NZ
 College for Creative Studies, USA
 Academy of Art University, USA
 University of Portsmouth, UK

References

1991 establishments in Malaysia
Art schools in Malaysia
Design schools in Malaysia
Colleges in Malaysia
Universities and colleges in Selangor
Educational institutions established in 1991
Subang Jaya